Costa Rica, officially the Republic of Costa Rica, is a sovereign state in Central America.

Costa Rica may also refer to:

Places
Costa Rica, Sinaloa, a town south of Culiacán in Sinaloa, Mexico
Costa Rica, Mato Grosso do Sul, a municipality located in the Brazilian state of Mato Grosso do Sul
Costa Rica (El Salvador, Cuba), a locality in El Salvador, Cuba

Others
"Costa Rica" (Dreamville, Bas and JID song), a 2019 song by Dreamville, from the album Revenge of the Dreamers III
"Costa Rica" (Benjamin Ingrosso song), a 2019 song by Benjamin Ingrosso
 "Costa Rica", a 2020 song by Bankrol Hayden